Lebanon station is a train station in Lebanon, Tennessee, serving Nashville's regional rail line, the Music City Star. Service began September 18, 2006.

References

External links
Station from Greenwood Street from Google Maps Street View

Buildings and structures in Wilson County, Tennessee
Music City Star stations
Railway stations in the United States opened in 2006
Lebanon, Tennessee
2006 establishments in Tennessee